Santo Antônio do Içá is a community and a municipality in the state of Amazonas near the Colombian border in Brazil. The population is 21,243 (2020 est.) in an area of 12,307 km². The municipality was created in 1955 out of São Paulo de Olivença. The city is served by Ipiranga Airport.

The municipality contains the  Javari-Buriti Area of Relevant Ecological Interest, created in 1985.
It contains parts of the Jutaí-Solimões Ecological Station.

References

External links
  Santo Antônio do Içá on citybrazil.com.br

Municipalities in Amazonas (Brazilian state)
Populated places on the Amazon